Biederbach is a municipality in the district of Emmendingen in Baden-Württemberg in Germany.

References

Emmendingen (district)